The multiple non-transferable vote (MNTV) is a group of voting system, in which voters elect several representatives at once, with each voter having more than one vote. MNTV uses multi-member electoral districts or only one district, which contains all voters, which is used to provide at-large representation.

MNTV systems are not designed towards obtaining proportional representation; instead the usual result is that where the candidates divide into definitive parties (especially for example where those parties have party lines which are whipped) the most popular party in the district sees its full slate of candidates elected, resulting in a landslide.

The exceptions to this are Limited Voting or Cumulative Voting, both of which are brought in on purpose to produce diverse representation—minority representation as well as representation of the largest group. But other systems have proven themselves more dependable at producing Proportional Representation than those two - party-list PR or Single Transferable Voting, for example.

MNTV systems include: 
 Plurality block voting (BV), also known as "plurality at-large", where each voter has as many votes as there are seats to be filled, but can cast no more than one vote per candidate (May result in election by plurality, which may be a one-party sweep by a minority group)
 Limited voting (LV), where each voter has less votes than there are seats to be filled, but can cast no more than one per candidate (resulting in semi-proportional representation)
 Limited block approval voting, where each voter has more votes than there are seats to be filled, but can cast no more than one vote per candidate (resulting in majoritarian representation)
 Block approval voting (a type of multi-winner approval voting), where each voter may vote for any number of candidates, but cast no more than one vote per candidate (resulting in majoritarian representation)
 Cumulative voting, where voters have a multiple number of votes, and they may assign more than one vote to a candidate. Produces semi-proportional representation.

The multiple winners are usually elected simultaneously in one round of voting and the vote is non-transferable, unlike under preferential block voting. MNTV sometimes appears in a runoff (two-round) version, as in some local elections in France, where candidates who do not receive an absolute majority must compete in a second round. In these cases, it is more accurately called "majority-at-large voting".

The single non-transferable vote (SNTV) is the extreme version of limited voting, when each voter can vote for only one candidate.

Terminology

Block voting 
The term "plurality at-large" is in common usage in elections for representative members of a body who are elected or appointed to represent the whole membership of the body (for example, a city, state or province, nation, club or association). Where the system is used in a territory divided into multi-member electoral districts the system is commonly referred to as "block voting" or the "bloc vote". Block voting as described in this article is "unlimited voting", unlike "limited voting", where a voter has fewer votes than the number of seats contested. The term "block voting" sometimes means simple plurality election of slates (electoral lists) in multi-member districts. In such a system, each party puts forward a slate (party-list) of candidates, a voter casts just one vote, and the party winning a plurality of votes sees its whole slate elected, winning all the seats.

Variations of the MNTV

Plurality block voting (BV) 

In a block voting election, all candidates run against each other for m number of positions, where m is commonly called the district magnitude. Each voter selects up to m candidates on the ballot (voters are sometimes said to have m votes; however, they are unable to vote for the same candidate more than once as is permitted in cumulative voting). Voters are most commonly permitted to cast their votes across more than one party list. The m candidates with the most votes (who may or may not obtain a majority of available votes) are the winners and will fill the positions.

Majority-at-large voting / Two-round block voting 

The majority-at-large voting is the plurality-at-large voting, but candidates who do not receive an absolute majority must compete in a second round.

Limited voting (LV) / Partial block voting 

Partial block voting, also called limited voting, functions similarly to plurality-at-large voting, however in partial block voting each voter receives fewer votes than the number of candidates to be elected. This in turn can enable reasonably sized minorities to achieve some representation, as it becomes impossible for a simple plurality to sweep every seat. Partial bloc voting is used for elections to the Gibraltar Parliament, where each voter has 10 votes and 17 seats are open for election; the usual result is that the most popular party wins 10 seats and forms the ruling administration, while the second most popular wins seven seats and forms the opposition. Partial block voting is also used in the Spanish Senate, where there are four seats per constituency and each voter receives three votes. Historically, partial block voting was used in three- and four-member constituencies in the United Kingdom, where voters received two votes, until multimember constituencies were abolished.

Under partial block voting, the fewer votes each voter is granted the smaller the number of voters needed to win becomes and the more like proportional representation the results can be, provided that voters and candidates use proper strategy. At the extreme, if each voter receives only one vote, then the voting system becomes equivalent to the single non-transferable vote. Many votes can be wasted and vote-splitting can produce unfair results (but likely more balanced than elections under Block Voting). Due to these reasons, the portion of votes needed to win a seat under SNTV may be quite small indeed. (Single transferable voting is more scientific, producing less wasted votes. Under STV, the minimum proportion needed to assure victory is the Droop quota, although commonly one or two in each contest are elected with less than that.)

Block approval voting 
In block approval voting, every voter may vote for any number of candidates (but no more than once for each candidate)

Cumulative voting

General ticket / Party block voting (PBV) 

Party block voting (PBV), or general ticket, is the party-list version of the block vote. In contrast to the classic block vote, where the candidates may formally stand as non-partisan and some minority nominations can be theoretically successful, PBV each candidate are linked to their party-list, which is voted by the electors producing a landslide, and any minority representation is excluded. 
This system is used to elect the vast majority of the Parliament of Singapore.

Compared to preferential block voting 
Block voting, or plurality block voting, is often compared with preferential block voting as both systems tend to produce landslide victories for similar candidates. Instead of a series of checkboxes, preferential block voting uses a preferential ballot, therefore it is not a multiple non-transferable vote, but a multiple transferable vote. A slate of clones of the top preferred candidate will win every seat under both systems, however in preferential block voting this is instead the instant-runoff winner.

See also 
Voting bloc
Municipal elections in France
Block approval voting
Single non-transferable vote

Notes

References
 http://www.mtholyoke.edu/offices/comm/oped/voter_rights.shtml
 Rogers v. Lodge, (1982) Supreme Court Case

External links 
A Handbook of Electoral System Design from International IDEA
Electoral Design Reference Materials from the ACE Project
ACE Electoral Knowledge Network Expert site providing encyclopedia on Electoral Systems and Management, country by country data, a library of electoral materials, latest election news, the opportunity to submit questions to a network of electoral experts, and a forum to discuss all of the above
TallyJ Election System A website tool customized to support Baha'i elections.

Non-proportional multi-winner electoral systems
Approval voting